The 2023 Women's Revelations Cup was the second edition of the Women's Revelations Cup, an international invitational women's football tournament organized by the Mexican Football Federation. Unlike the previous 2022 edition, the 2023 edition presented senior national teams. It was held in León, Mexico from 15 to 21 February 2023.

Host Mexico won the tournament after ending with the same number of points (5) and goal difference (+1) as Colombia, but with fewer yellow cards received (3 vs. 6).

Venue
All matches were played at Estadio León in León, Guanajuato.

Format
The four invited teams played a round-robin tournament. Points awarded in the group stage followed the formula of three points for a win, one point for a draw, and zero points for a loss. A tie in points was decided by goal differential.

Teams

Squads

Standings

Results
All times are local (UTC−5).

Goalscorers

References

External links
Official website

Women's Revelations Cup
Women's Revelations Cup
2023